Alice Charlotta Tegnér (Sandström; 12 March 1864  –  26 May 1943) was a Swedish music teacher, poet and composer. She is the foremost composer of Swedish children's songs during the late 19th century and the first half of the 20th century.

Background
Born Alice Charlotta Sandström in Karlshamn, Sweden, she was the daughter of Eduard Sandström (1829–1879), a ship captain. She was very musical and began taking piano lessons early. She attended seminars  in Stockholm (Högre lärarinneseminariet) and trained as a teacher. After graduation, she served as governess. Alice Tegnér was a teacher at Djursholms samskola and cantor in Djursholms chapel where Natanael Beskow was a preacher.

In 1885, she married Jakob Tegnér (1851–1926), a lawyer, and later secretary of the Swedish Publishers' Association and editor of Svenska Bokhandelstidningen.

Career
Alice Tegnér wrote many well-known children's songs in Swedish, most notably Mors lilla Olle.  It was published during 1895 in volume 3 of  Sjung med oss, mamma!

Tegnér also in such classical genres as chamber and sacred music together with choral music, cantatas, cello  and violin sonatas. Her songs and compositions were inspired by both folk and art music. Her well-known hymnbook Nu ska vi sjunga, with illustrations by Elsa Beskow, was published in 1943.

Awards

 1914  Litteris et Artibus
1926 member of the Swedish Royal Academy of Music (Kungliga Musikaliska akademien)
 1929 First prize in the magazine Idun tonsättartävling

Selected works

Children's songs
 Asarumsdalen
 Baka kaka
 Borgmästar Munthe
 Bä, bä, vita lamm
 Dansa min docka
 Ekorrn satt i granen"
 Hemåt i regnväder (text: Zacharias Topelius)
 I skogen Julbocken Kring julgranen Lasse liten (text: Zacharias Topelius)
 Marschlek Skogsblommorna till barnen (text: Elsa Beskow)
 SockerbagareOther songs
 Var är den Vän, som överallt jag söker (text: Johan Olof Wallin)
 Betlehems stjärna (Gläns över sjö och strand) (text: Viktor Rydberg)
 Hell, vårt land!''

Other works
 Violin Sonata in A Minor

References

External links

 
 
 LIBRIS Search Services.
 Sjung med oss, Mamma! – 161 children’s songs as NWC, MIDI and PDF files.

1864 births
1943 deaths
Litteris et Artibus recipients
People from Karlshamn
Swedish classical composers
Swedish classical organists
Women classical composers
Children's songwriters
Swedish songwriters
Women organists
Swedish women composers